NA-139 Pakpattan-I is a constituency for the National Assembly of Pakistan. It mainly comprises Pakpattan Tehsil and includes a majority of the areas from the old NA-164 Pakpattan-I, while basically being an expanded version of the previous NA-165 Pakpattan-II.

Members of Parliament

2018-2022: NA-145 Pakpattan-I

Election 2002 

General elections were held on 10 Oct 2002. Mian Ahmed Raza Manika of PML-Q won by 38,522 votes.

Election 2008 

General elections were held on 18 Feb 2008. Syed Salman Mohsin Gilani of PML-N won by 67,400 votes.

Election 2013 

General elections were held on 11 May 2013. Syed Athar Hussain Shah of PML-N won by 71,804 votes and became the  member of National Assembly.

Election 2018 

General elections were held on 25 July 2018.

See also
NA-138 Okara-IV
NA-140 Pakpattan-II

References

External links 
Election result's official website

NA-165